The 2011 Phillip Island Six Hour was an endurance motor race for production cars. It was held on 29 May 2011 at the Phillip Island Grand Prix Circuit in Phillip Island, Victoria, Australia. It was Round 2 of the 2011 Australian Manufacturers' Championship, Round 2 of the 2011 Australian Production Car Championship and Round 1 of the 2011 Australian Production Car Endurance Championship. The race was won by Stuart Kostera and Ian Tulloch, driving a Mitsubishi Lancer Evolution X. The Mazda 3 MPS of Jake Camilleri and Scott Nicholas finished a lap down in second with the Lancer Evolution 9 of Jim Pollicina, Dean Kelland and Steve Cramp a further lap down in third.

Class Structure
 Class A – Extreme Performance
 Class B – High Performance
 Class C – Performance Touring
 Class D – Production Touring
 Class E – Compact Touring
 Class I – Invitational

Results
Results were as follows:

* – driver did not drive car in race.

References

External links
 Australian Manufacturers' Championship at www.manufacturerschampionship.com.au
 Supplementary Regulations at www.phillipislandcircuit.com.au
 Images at www.flickr.com
 Race report at www.speedcafe.com.au

Phillip Island Six Hour
Motorsport at Phillip Island
Australian Manufacturers' Championship
Australian Production Car Championship